amsynth is an open source realtime software synthesizer for Linux. Its operation is similar to analog Moog Minimoog and Roland Juno-60, which are considered classic synthesizers from the 1970s.

The two main oscillators support five cyclic waveforms and one noise source. There is also an LFO for vibrato effects.

See also

 List of music software

References

External links

Free audio software
Free software programmed in C++
Open source software synthesizers